Sven van der Maaten (born 23 March 1994) is a Dutch footballer who plays for SVV Scheveningen as a goalkeeper.

Career
Ahead of the 2018–19 season, he joined SC Telstar on a permanent move.

On 13 May 2020, van der Maaten joined SVV Scheveningen.

References

1994 births
Living people
Association football goalkeepers
Dutch footballers
Eerste Divisie players
NAC Breda players
SC Telstar players
People from Harderwijk
Footballers from Gelderland
SBV Vitesse players
DVS '33 players
SVV Scheveningen players
Tweede Divisie players